José Mera (born 11 March 1979) is a retired Colombian football defender.

Statistics (Official games/Colombian Ligue and Colombian Cup)
(Updated 14 November 2010)

References

External links

1979 births
Living people
Deportes Quindío footballers
Independiente Medellín footballers
Deportivo Cali footballers
Club Libertad footballers
Deportivo Pereira footballers
Deportivo Pasto footballers
Caracas FC players
Millonarios F.C. players
Categoría Primera A players
Paraguayan Primera División players
Colombian footballers
Colombia international footballers
Colombian expatriate footballers
Expatriate footballers in Paraguay
Expatriate footballers in Venezuela
2003 FIFA Confederations Cup players
2003 CONCACAF Gold Cup players
Association football defenders
Sportspeople from Cauca Department